NUIST station, is a metro station of Line S8 of the Nanjing Metro. It started operations on 1 August 2014. This station is near Nanjing University of Information Science and Technology.

References

Railway stations in Jiangsu
Railway stations in China opened in 2014
Nanjing Metro stations
Railway stations in China at university and college campuses